Seticeros is a genus of beetles in the longhorn beetle family, Cerambycidae.

The following species are recognised in the genus Seticeros:

 Seticeros aquilus (Thomson, 1865)
 Seticeros convergens Vlasak & Santos-Silva, 2021
 Seticeros granulocephalus Ramirez, Esteban & Santos-Silva, 2011
 Seticeros tunupai Perger & Santos-Silva, 2010

References

Prioninae